Anna Catherine Turley (born 9 October 1978) is a British politician. She was the Labour and Co-operative Member of Parliament (MP) for Redcar from 2015 until 2019. Turley was chair of the Co-operative Party from 8 June 2019 until December 2019. She currently serves as chair of the North East Child Poverty Commission (NECPC).

Early life and career
Turley was born in Dartford, and received an academic scholarship to attend the independent Ashford School. She went on to read History at Greyfriars, Oxford.

From 2001 to 2005, Turley was a fast-stream civil servant at the Home Office, initially working on youth crime issues, and later moved to the Department for Work and Pensions, specialising in child poverty issues. In 2005, Turley became a special adviser in the Department for Work and Pensions under David Blunkett, then in 2006 for the Cabinet Office under Hilary Armstrong.

Early political career

In 2006, Turley stood for election as a Labour council candidate for Wandsworth Common.

In 2007, Turley worked for public relations agency The Ledbury Group. In April 2008, she became deputy director of the local government research organisation the New Local Government Network, and in 2010 co-founded the Co-operative Councils Innovation Network designed to enable local authorities to work in partnership with local communities.

Turley was shortlisted for the North West Durham seat for the 2010 general election but lost out to Pat Glass.
In 2011, Turley founded a consultancy and online forum ProgLoc (Progressive Localism) for progressive debate of key issues affecting local government, and became an associate researcher for the NGO Future of London. In 2012 Turley was listed as a speaker for the New Labour pressure group Progress.
In 2013, Turley became a senior research fellow at IPPR North.

In 2013, Turley was selected to stand in the Redcar constituency from an all-women shortlist, in a contentious selection process that was ultimately associated with the resignation of ten Labour councillors.

Parliamentary career
Turley became the member of parliament for Redcar at the May 2015 general election, winning the seat from the Liberal Democrats. She was appointed as a member of the Home Affairs Select Committee in July 2015, and later the Business, Energy and Industrial Strategy Committee.

Soon after becoming an MP, Turley had to respond to major local employer SSI UK, which operated Teesside Steelworks, going into liquidation, leading to about 3,000 local job losses.  The steelworks had once employed about 40,000. Turley set up a local SSI Taskforce, and secured £50 million pounds from the government to help support retraining and new jobs.

She supported Andy Burnham in the 2015 leadership election. In September 2015, the newly elected Labour leader Jeremy Corbyn appointed Turley as shadow civil society minister in his first shadow cabinet. Turley was a critic of Corbyn, and resigned as a Shadow Minister in June 2016. In the 2016 leadership election campaign soon afterwards, Turley stated that Corbyn was "completely out of touch with reality", and supported Owen Smith for leader. She would later argue that Labour had "moved too far to the left" and had "issues around national security as well as with antisemitism".

In 2016, Turley introduced a private member's bill to increase the maximum sentences available to the courts for specified offences related to animal cruelty to five years. She queued from 2am until 10am to table the bill. The Animal Welfare (Sentencing) Act was passed in April 2021, and came into force on 29 June 2021.

In the 2017 general election, Turley was re-elected with 23,623 votes, a share of 55.5%. She became chair of the All-Party Parliamentary Groups ("APPGs") on Hydrogen and Bingo, Secretary of the APPG on Steel and Metal Related Industry and a member of the APPGs on Endometriosis, Speedway, Loan Charge, Carbon Capture and Storage, Performers Alliance, Music, Equitable Life, Fair Business Banking and the All-Party Parliamentary Dog Advisory Welfare Group. She is also a member of various Labour Party groups, including the Labour Movement for Europe, LGBT Labour, Jewish Labour Movement, Labour Campaign for International Development, Labour Friends of Israel, Labour Friends of Palestine & the Middle East and Labour Party Irish Society.

In the 2019 general election, Turley lost her seat to the Conservative candidate. She blamed party leader Jeremy Corbyn for the loss. On 19 December 2019, following a six-day trial at the Royal Courts of Justice, Turley won a libel claim against Unite the Union and Stephen Walker (editor of The Skwawkbox); the court upheld that her reputation had been damaged by Walker and Unite during the election.

Post-political career
During the COVID-19 pandemic, Turley helped run the local foodbank, and set up a charity to distribute books to disadvantaged children.

In February 2022, she was appointed chair of the North East Child Poverty Commission (NECPC), an organisation campaigning to end child poverty in the North East.

Since leaving parliament, Turley has also worked as a sports consultant for the Betting and Gaming Council, an organisation which represents the gambling industry, and in April 2021 wrote a paid advertorial in the New Statesman for the organisation opposing limits on betting, suggesting that they would alienate red wall voters.

Personal life
Turley has lived in Redcar since 2012. Previously she lived in Islington, London.

In the second half of 2017, Turley required five operations to alleviate problems with infected cysts; the emergency surgery caused her to suspend parliamentary work for over a month. She became a vocal campaigner on endometriosis, and launched an inquiry into women's experiences through the APPG on Endometriosis.

References

External links

1978 births
Living people
Alumni of Greyfriars, Oxford
English civil servants
Female members of the Parliament of the United Kingdom for English constituencies
Labour Co-operative MPs for English constituencies
Labour Friends of Israel
People educated at Ashford School
UK MPs 2015–2017
UK MPs 2017–2019
21st-century British women politicians
21st-century English women
21st-century English people